The 2016 Al Habtoor Tennis Challenge was a professional tennis tournament played on outdoor hard courts. It was the nineteenth edition of the tournament and part of the 2016 ITF Women's Circuit, offering a total of $100,000+H in prize money. It took place in Dubai, United Arab Emirates, on 12–18 December 2016.

Singles main draw entrants

Seeds 

 1 Rankings as of 5 December 2015

Other entrants 
The following players received wildcards into the singles main draw:
  Fatma Al-Nabhani
  Jana Fett
  Olesya Pervushina
  Galina Voskoboeva

The following players received entry from the qualifying draw:
  Lesley Kerkhove
  Quirine Lemoine
  Patty Schnyder
  Anastasiya Vasylyeva

The following player received entry by using protected rankings:
  Ksenia Pervak

Champions

Singles

 Hsieh Su-wei def.  Natalia Vikhlyantseva, 6–2, 6–2

Doubles

 Mandy Minella /  Nina Stojanović def.  Hsieh Su-wei /  Valeria Savinykh, 6–3, 3–6, [10–4]

External links 
 2016 Al Habtoor Tennis Challenge at ITFtennis.com
 Official website

2016 ITF Women's Circuit
2016
2016
2016 in Emirati tennis
Al Habtoor Tennis Challenge